The 2019–20 Purdue Boilermakers women's basketball team represents Purdue University during the 2019–20 NCAA Division I women's basketball season. Boilermakers, led by 14th year head coach Sharon Versyp, play their home games at Mackey Arena and were a members of the Big Ten Conference.

Roster

Schedule

|-
!colspan=9 style=| Exhibition

|-
!colspan=9 style=| Non-conference regular season

|-
!colspan=9 style=| Big Ten conference season

|-
!colspan=9 style=| Big Ten Women's Tournament

Rankings

See also
2019–20 Purdue Boilermakers men's basketball team

References

Purdue Boilermakers women's basketball seasons
Purdue
Purdue
Purdue